Seisyll or Seisyllt is a Welsh male given name. It may refer to:

 Kings Sisillius I and II, legendary kings of the Britons
 Seisyll ap Clydog (late 7th century), a king of Ceredigion
 Seisyll ap Rhun (10th century)
 Seisyll ap Ednywain or Owain, father of King Llywelyn of Gwynedd
 Seisyll ap Dyfnwal (12th century), a lord of Upper Gwent
 Seisyll Bryffwrch (12th century), a poet
 Seisyll ap Rhun Fychan (13th century)

See also
 Selyf, a variant of the same name